Bhimrao is an Indian given name. Notable persons with this name include:

 Bhimrao Ambedkar (1891-1956), Indian polymath and social reformer
 Bhimrao Badade (born 1947), Indian politician
 Bhimrao Panchale (born 1951), Marathi poet and Ghazal singer
 Bhimrao Tapkir, Indian politician